This is a list of properties and historic districts in Reading, Massachusetts, copied from the National Register of Historic Places. These are in Middlesex County, Massachusetts.

The locations of National Register properties and districts (at least for all showing latitude and longitude coordinates below) may be seen in an online map by clicking on "Map of all coordinates".

Current listings

|}

References

Reading, Massachusetts
Reading
 
Reading, Massachusetts